The Notre-Dame-de-la-Nativité de Bercy church is a Catholic church located in the 12th arrondissement of Paris, in the Bercy district, on Place Lachambeaudie. It is also often called Notre-Dame de Bercy.

The responsibility for the parish has been entrusted by the Archbishop of Paris to the Emmanuel Community.

History 
Before the construction of the Notre-Dame-de-la-Nativité church in Bercy, the inhabitants of what was, at the time, the village of Bercy, were very far from their parish church - Église Sainte-Marguerite in the Faubourg Saint-Antoine. In 1677, the church was built by the fathers of Christian doctrine, who gave it the name of Notre-Dame de Bon Secours. The convent church became a parish church in 1790, following the creation of the commune of Bercy.

It was demolished in 1821 because it was almost in ruins, but was rebuilt in the following years (the first stone was placed on June 8, 1823) by the architect André Chatillon. It was consecrated in 1826 with the name of Our Lady of the Nativity.

In May 1871, the church was destroyed again during the uprising of the Paris Commune, along with the first Town Hall of the twelfth arrondissement. It is the only Parisian church to suffer this fate. The church was then rebuilt to an identical plan by the architect Antoine-Julien Hénard, who was also rebuilt the 12th arrondissement’s town hall.

The church was completely inundated during the Seine flood of 1910.

In April 1944, during the Second World War, the church was damaged by the bombardment of the nearby railway tracks of Gare de Lyon. 

In 1982, a fire destroyed the first bench, a crucifix and part of the floor. It was restored in 1985.

The church was listed as a historical monument in 1982.

Architecture 

The architecture of the church is modeled on ancient Roman basilicas.

The church has a main nave and two side naves with slightly projecting transepts. Its style, sober and solid, is however distinguished by a porch of classical style, with pediment and columns, and by an apse decorated on the outside with Byzantine-inspired motifs.

The two sculptures on the facade — of Saint Peter and Saint Paul — are 1866 works by students of the French school.

Interior 
The church has a remarkable collection of religious paintings from the 17th and 18th centuries, including:

 Jesus and the Samaritan Woman (Jacques Stella, c.1640-1645);
 The Nativity (17th Century Flemish School);
 The Assassination of Saint Thomas Becket (Jean Baptiste-Marie Pierre, 1748);
 The Annunciation (Daniel Hallé, 1659), a work donated by the city of Paris in 1877;
 The Resurrection of Jairus' Daughter (Charles de La Fosse, circa 1680)
A small statue of the monk Émilion de Combes, patron saint of wine merchants, is also on display, as the church is located in the warehouse district of Bercy.

A contemporary painting, Divine Light (Annunciation), located in front of the choir, is a work by Monique Baroni (1930-2016). A tin foil sculpture represents the Good Thief. It is the work of Michel Laude and dates from 1996.

The organ was built by the brothers Stolz & Frères, sons of Jean-Baptiste Stoltz, around 1880. It consists of two keyboards with mechanical action and thirteen stops.

References 

Roman Catholic churches in the 12th arrondissement of Paris